Lindsay Carole Jenkins (born 1977) is an American lawyer and former assistant United States attorney from Illinois who is serving as a United States district judge of the United States District Court for the Northern District of Illinois.

Education 

Jenkins received a Bachelor of Arts from Miami University in 1998 and a Juris Doctor, summa cum laude, from Cleveland–Marshall College of Law of Cleveland State University in 2002.

Career 

From 2002 to 2004, she served as a law clerk for Judge Solomon Oliver Jr. of the United States District Court for the Northern District of Ohio. From 2004 to 2006, she was an associate at Jones Day. From 2006 to 2021, she was an assistant United States attorney in the United States Attorney's Office for the Northern District of Illinois; she has served in roles, including Deputy Chief and later Chief of the General Crimes section and eventually Chief of the Violent Crimes section. From 2021 to 2023, she was a partner at Cooley LLP in Chicago, where her focus was on white collar crime. She has taught trial advocacy courses at Loyola University Chicago School of Law. She has also taught at the Northwestern University Pritzker School of Law on the Chicago gun violence epidemic.

Notable cases 

In 2015, Jenkins prosecuted Chicago's public schools chief Barbara Byrd-Bennett. Byrd-Bennett pleaded guilty in federal court to using her position as chief executive officer of the Chicago Public Schools to guide lucrative no-bid contracts to her former employer in exchange for bribes and kickbacks.

In 2016, Jenkins was part of a team of lawyers from the United States Department of Justice that investigated the force practices of the Chicago Police Department, being part of the prosecution team in United States v. Aldo Brown.

Federal judicial service 

In December 2021, Jenkins was recommended to the president by Senators Dick Durbin and Tammy Duckworth. On July 14, 2022, President Joe Biden announced his intent to nominate Jenkins to serve as a United States district judge of the United States District Court for the Northern District of Illinois. On September 19, 2022, her nomination was sent to the Senate. President Biden nominated Jenkins to the seat vacated by Judge John Z. Lee, who was elevated to the United States Court of Appeals for the Seventh Circuit on September 12, 2022. On October 12, 2022, a hearing on her nomination was held before the Senate Judiciary Committee. On December 1, 2022, her nomination was reported out of committee by a 15–7 vote. On January 3, 2023, her nomination was returned to the President under Rule XXXI, Paragraph 6 of the United States Senate; she was renominated later the same day. On February 2, 2023, her nomination was reported out of committee by a 14–6 vote. On February 14, 2023, the Senate invoked cloture on her nomination by a 58–41 vote. That same day, her nomination was confirmed by a 59–40 vote. She received her judicial commission on February 24, 2023.

See also 
 List of African-American federal judges
 List of African-American jurists

References

External links 

1977 births
Living people
21st-century American women judges
21st-century American judges
21st-century American women lawyers
21st-century American lawyers
African-American lawyers
Assistant United States Attorneys
Cleveland–Marshall College of Law alumni
Jones Day people
Judges of the United States District Court for the Northern District of Illinois
Loyola University Chicago School of Law faculty
Miami University alumni
Northwestern University Pritzker School of Law faculty
People from Cleveland
United States district court judges appointed by Joe Biden